Nur-Seleniye is a rural locality (an ulus) in Ivolginsky District, Republic of Buryatia, Russia. The population was 1,871 as of 2010. There are 54 streets.

Geography 
Nur-Seleniye is located 13 km northeast of Ivolginsk (the district's administrative centre) by road. Suzha is the nearest rural locality.

References 

Rural localities in Ivolginsky District